Laurelhurst Market is a steakhouse on East Burnside Street in Portland, Oregon's Kerns neighborhood, in the United States. The New American restaurant was opened by chefs Ben Dyer, David Kreifels, and Jason Owens, in 2009.

See also
 List of New American restaurants
 List of steakhouses

References

External links

 
 
 Laurelhurst Market at Lonely Planet
 Laurelhurst Market at Travel + Leisure

2009 establishments in Oregon
Kerns, Portland, Oregon
New American restaurants in Portland, Oregon
Northeast Portland, Oregon
Restaurants established in 2009
Steakhouses in Portland, Oregon